Nam Ji-hyun may refer to:
 Nam Ji-hyun (actress, born 1990) (born 1990), birth name of actress and former 4Minute member
 Nam Ji-hyun (actress) (born 1995)